F-117A Stealth Fighter is combat flight simulator for the Nintendo Entertainment System where the player fights enemy aircraft and destroy ground targets.

Gameplay
The player takes control of a stealth fighter aircraft, and is required to pilot the craft on a series of missions to destroy ground targets. The equipment of the player's craft can be customized, with different missile and bombs available for different combat roles.

Early levels of this game are based on actual conflicts, such as the 1986 United States bombing of Libya, the Gulf War, and the United States Invasion of Panama. Later missions involve theoretical conflicts in Korea and the Soviet Union, and move on to science-fiction events involving secret missions and UFOs.

External links
 F-117 Stealth Fighter at GameFAQs

1992 video games
Cold War video games
Combat flight simulators
MicroProse games
Nintendo Entertainment System games
Nintendo Entertainment System-only games
North America-exclusive video games
Video games developed in the United States
Video games set in Africa
Video games set in Libya
Video games set in Korea
Video games set in the Middle East
Video games set in the Soviet Union
Video games set in Panama
Video games set in East Germany
Video games set in Iran